The Carroll News is the student-run, co-curricular newspaper at John Carroll University, in University Heights, Ohio. It is published weekly during the Fall and Spring semesters. The Carroll News was first published in 1925 covering John Carroll University and St. Ignatius High School. However, once the high school founded its own newspaper in 1927, The Carroll News began covering only the University.

The paper has seven sections, Campus, Arts & Life, Sports, World News, Business, Editorial and Op/Ed, and Diversions.

Awards 
In 2005 and 2006, The Carroll News was named the nation's best weekly newspaper in overall excellence by the Society of Collegiate Journalists, the oldest national honorary collegiate journalism organization.

In 2006, the newspaper won 13 national and regional awards, the most in the paper's 80-year history.

In 2007, The Carroll News was named second-best overall paper in Region 4 (Michigan, Ohio, West Virginia, and Western Pennsylvania) by the Society of Professional Journalists.  Three staffers also won individual awards.

In 2020, The Carroll News was named the best overall college paper affiliated with its school in Region 4 by the Society of Professional Journalists.

References

External links 

John Carroll University
Student newspapers published in Ohio
Publications established in 1925